Ebenezer Baptist Church is a megachurch church located in Atlanta, Georgia, United States, affiliated with the Progressive National Baptist Convention and American Baptist Churches USA. It was the church where Dr. Martin Luther King Jr. was co-pastor from 1960 until his assassination in 1968, the location of the funerals of both Dr. King and congressman John Lewis, and the church for which United States Senator Raphael Warnock has been pastor since 2005. It is located in the historic area now designated as the Martin Luther King Jr. National Historical Park.

History
The church was founded in 1886 by Pastor John A. Parker and eight people, on Airline Street. The church's name derives from the Books of Samuel, where the Samuel names a place "Ebenezer", meaning "stone of help", to commemorate God helping the Israelites defeat the Philistines.

Adam Daniel Williams (maternal grandfather of Martin Luther King Jr.) became pastor in 1894, and the church had only 13 members. It grew to 400 members by 1903 and in 1913, the church had 750 people. In 1922, the building was dedicated. In 1927, Martin Luther King Sr. became assistant pastor, with his father-in-law. He later became the senior pastor when Rev. Williams died in 1931. In 1960, Martin Luther King Jr. became co-pastor of the church with his father until his (Dr. King's) assassination in 1968.

In 1999, a new 1,700-seat church building called the Horizon Sanctuary was inaugurated within the Martin Luther King Jr. National Historical Park.

Since 2005, U.S. Senator Raphael Warnock has been the senior pastor of Ebenezer Baptist Church; he is the fifth person to serve as Ebenezer's senior pastor since its founding. On January 30, 2020, Warnock announced his campaign for Kelly Loeffler's Senate seat during the 2020 special election. In a special runoff election on January 5, 2021, Reverend Warnock defeated Loeffler receiving 51% of the popular vote. With this victory, Warnock made history by becoming the first Black senator from the state of Georgia.  On December 6, 2022, Warnock made further history by becoming the first Black senator from Georgia elected to a full six-year term.

The funeral of Martin Luther King Jr. was held at the church on April 9, 1968. The funeral of Rayshard Brooks was held on June 23, 2020, at the church. The funeral of John Lewis was held on July 30, 2020, at the church.

In 2021, it had 6,000 members.

Pastors
The pastors of Ebenezer Baptist Church since its foundation have been as follows:
 1886–1894: The Reverend John A. Parker
 1894–1931: The Reverend Adam Daniel Williams 
 1931–1975: The Reverend Martin Luther King Sr.; with three co-pastors
 1960–1968: The Reverend Doctor Martin Luther King Jr. as co-pastor
 1968–1969: The Reverend Alfred Daniel Williams King
 1971–1975: The Reverend Doctor Otis Moss
 1975–2005: The Reverend Doctor Joseph L. Roberts Jr.
 2005–present: The Honorable Reverend Doctor Senator Raphael Warnock, United States Senator since 2021.

Gallery

References

Citations

Sources
 Cited sources

External links
 Official Website

 

African-American history in Atlanta
Baptist churches in Atlanta
Sweet Auburn
Religious organizations established in 1877
1877 establishments in Georgia (U.S. state)
Evangelical megachurches in the United States